Chen Xiaoting (born 11 January 1991) is a Chinese weightlifter.

External links
the-sports.org

1991 births
Living people
World Weightlifting Championships medalists
Chinese female weightlifters
20th-century Chinese women
21st-century Chinese women